This is a list of the 73 members of the European Parliament for Italy in the Ninth European Parliament.

After Brexit, Italy gained three extra seats that were distributed from the British delegation of MEPs.

Following the 2022 general election in Italy, nine MEPs were elected to the Italian Parliament and were replaced on their party lists by; Denis Nesci, Matteo Gazzini, Elisabetta De Blasis, Paola Ghidoni, Maria Angela Danzì, Beatrice Covassi, Alessandra Mussolini, Lara Comi and Achille Variati.

List 
On the League list: (ID)

 Matteo Adinolfi
 Simona Baldassarre
 Alessandra Basso
 Mara Bizzotto
 Cinzia Bonfrisco
 Paolo Borchia
 Marco Campomenosi
 Andrea Caroppo
 Massimo Casanova
 Susanna Ceccardi
 Angelo Ciocca
 Rosanna Conte
 Gianantonio Da Re
 Francesca Donato
 Marco Dreosto
 Gianna Gancia
 Valentino Grant
 Danilo Lancini
 Elena Lizzi
 Alessandro Panza
 Luisa Regimenti
 Antonio Maria Rinaldi
 Silvia Sardone
 Annalisa Tardino
 Isabella Tovaglieri
 Lucia Vuolo
 Stefania Zambelli
 Marco Zanni
 Vincenzo Sofo – since Brexit - 1 February 2020

On the Democratic Party list: (S&D)

 Pietro Bartolo
 Brando Benifei
 Simona Bonafé
 Carlo Calenda (since 28 August 2019 Action party and since 10 November 2021 Renew Europe)
 Caterina Chinnici
 Paolo De Castro
 Andrea Cozzolino
 Giuseppe Ferrandino
 Elisabetta Gualmini
 Roberto Gualtieri – until 5 September 2019; Nicola Danti – from 5 September 2019 (since 21 October 2019 Italia Viva and since 12 February 2020 Renew Europe)
 Pierfrancesco Majorino
 Alessandra Moretti
 Pina Picierno
 Giuliano Pisapia
 Franco Roberti
 David Sassoli – died on 11 January 2022; Camilla Laureti – from 11 January 2022
 Massimiliano Smeriglio
 Irene Tinagli
 Patrizia Toia

On the Five Star Movement list: (Non-Inscrits)

 Isabella Adinolfi
 Tiziana Beghin
 Fabio Massimo Castaldo
 Ignazio Corrao
 Rosa D'Amato
 Eleonora Evi
 Laura Ferrara
 Mario Furore
 Chiara Maria Gemma
 Dino Giarrusso
 Piernicola Pedicini
 Sabrina Pignedoli
 Daniela Rondinelli
 Marco Zullo

On the Forza Italia list: (EPP Group)

 Silvio Berlusconi
 Fulvio Martusciello
 Giuseppe Milazzo
 Aldo Patriciello
 Massimiliano Salini
 Antonio Tajani
 Salvatore De Meo – since Brexit - 1 February 2020

On the Brothers of Italy list: (ECR)

 Carlo Fidanza
 Pietro Fiocchi
 Raffaele Fitto
 Nicola Procaccini
 Raffaele Stancanelli
 Sergio Berlato – since Brexit - 1 February 2020

On the South Tyrolean People's Party list: (EPP Group)

 Herbert Dorfmann

References

See also 

 Member of the European Parliament

Lists of Members of the European Parliament for Italy
MEPs for Italy 2019–2024
Lists of Members of the European Parliament 2019–2024